Josefine Engström (born 1 September 1986) is a Swedish ski-orienteering competitor and world champion. She won a gold medal in the relay at the 2009 World Ski Orienteering Championships, with team members Helene Söderlund and Marie Ohlsson, and a bronze medal in middle distance. She also won the gold medal during the 2015 World Championships long distance event.

References

External links

Swedish orienteers
Female orienteers
Ski-orienteers
1986 births
Living people